Pelikan Island is the 290 m long in southwest-northeast direction and 160 m wide rocky island lying in Belimel Bay on the southwest coast of Trinity Island in the Palmer Archipelago, Antarctica.  It is “named after the ocean fishing trawler Pelikan of the Bulgarian company Ocean Fisheries – Burgas whose ships operated in the waters of South Georgia, Kerguelen, the South Orkney Islands, South Shetland Islands and Antarctic Peninsula from 1970 to the early 1990s.  The Bulgarian fishermen, along with those of the Soviet Union, Poland and East Germany are the pioneers of modern Antarctic fishing industry.”

Location
British mapping in 1978.

Maps
 British Antarctic Territory.  Scale 1:200000 topographic map. DOS 610 – W 63 60.  Tolworth, UK, 1978.
 Antarctic Digital Database (ADD). Scale 1:250000 topographic map of Antarctica. Scientific Committee on Antarctic Research (SCAR). Since 1993, regularly upgraded and updated.

Notes

References
 Pelikan Island. SCAR Composite Gazetteer of Antarctica.
 Bulgarian Antarctic Gazetteer. Antarctic Place-names Commission. (details in Bulgarian, basic data in English)

External links
 Pelikan Island. Copernix satellite image

Islands of the Palmer Archipelago
Ocean Fisheries – Burgas Co
Bulgaria and the Antarctic